Denmark – Montenegro relations refers to the current and historical relations between Denmark and Montenegro. Denmark is represented in Montenegro through its embassy in Belgrade, Serbia, and have an honorary consulate in Podgorica. Montenegro is represented in Denmark through its embassy in Belgrade, Serbia. Denmark recognized Montenegro on 15 June 2006 and diplomatic relations were established same day. Denmark assists Montenegro under the Neighborhood Programme. The assistance focuses on agricultural production. Both countries have signed an agreement about protection of investments.

Denmark supports Montenegro in the European Union. Danish Foreign Minister stressed: " Denmark supports [the] integration of the Western Balkan countries which would result in a more safe and a more united Europe, as well as that it would continue arguing for the principle of individual assessment of the countries which aspire to become members of the EU."

See also
Foreign relations of Denmark
Foreign relations of Montenegro 
Accession of Montenegro to the European Union
Nicholas I of Montenegro
Vida Ognjenović

References

 
Montenegro 
Bilateral relations of Montenegro